The 1976 Italian Grand Prix was a Formula One motor race held at the Autodromo Nazionale di Monza in Monza, Italy on 12 September 1976. The race, contested over 52 laps, was the thirteenth round of the 1976 Formula One season. It was also the 45th running of the Italian Grand Prix, the 23rd which was a part of the World Championship. Ronnie Peterson took the March team's last victory in Formula One, and his only with the team. Ferrari driver Clay Regazzoni finished the race in second position and polesitter Jacques Laffite completed the podium for Ligier. This was the last time Ferrari entered more than two cars for a race.

The race saw the return of World Championship leader Niki Lauda to the sport after his serious crash at the  - he finished this race in fourth place.

Background
Monza had been modified from the year before. The circuit featured 2 consecutive left-right chicanes creating the Variante del Rettifilo, added before the Curva Grande, and a left-right chicane called Variante della Roggia that was added before the first Lesmo curve.

Qualifying
The qualifying session on Friday was wet, so the dry session on Saturday was to provide the field with their best times. After this session, Brett Lunger, Arturo Merzario and the very slow Otto Stuppacher had failed to qualify. John Watson qualified in eighth position, with James Hunt ninth and Jochen Mass tenth, but their times were later disallowed due to fuel irregularities. This meant that their Friday times counted for their grid positions. As a result, these three drivers were the three slowest and were deemed not to have qualified, allowing Lunger, Merzario and Stuppacher on to the grid.

Stuppacher had already left the circuit and flown back home to Austria, so could not take his place on the grid. This promoted Hunt back into the 26 qualifiers. Merzario withdrew and promoted Mass, and later Guy Edwards also decided to withdraw in order to let Watson race.

Following the bankruptcy of the Boro team prior to the event, driver Larry Perkins convinced team management to release two mechanics to run an entry at Monza and qualified a season-best 13th.

Qualifying classification

Race
At the start, Jody Scheckter in the Tyrrell led ahead of Laffite's Ligier and teammate Patrick Depailler with Lauda down in the midfield. Mass, despite being promoted to 25th after Merzario withdrew, retired on lap 3 with ignition problems. McLaren's misfortunes didn't end there as Hunt, who had no chance of winning had tried to charge his way up through the field and spun off into gravel trap at the first corner chicane on lap 12. Peterson in the March had begun his charge up the field and took the lead on lap 15 as Scheckter dropped out of the top 4 leaving Peterson to battle with Depailler, Regazzoni and Laffite. Meanwhile, Hans Joachim Stuck in the other March collided with the Lotus of Mario Andretti on lap 24 forcing both drivers to retire. In the closing stages Depailler was suffering from engine problems but eventually finished 6th as Lauda got past both the Tyrrells for 4th place. Peterson took his first win in 2 years by 2.3 seconds over Regazzoni followed by Laffite in a strong third 3 seconds behind Peterson with Lauda fourth and the Tyrrells of Scheckter and Depailler rounding out the top 6.

Race classification

Championship standings after the race

Drivers' Championship standings

Constructors' Championship standings

Note: Only the top five positions are included for both sets of standings. Only the best 7 results from the first 8 races and the best 7 results from the last 8 races counted towards the Championship. Numbers without parentheses are Championship points; numbers in parentheses are total points scored. Points do not reflect final results of 1976 British Grand Prix as it was under appeal.

References

Italian Grand Prix
Italian Grand Prix
1976 in Italian motorsport
Italian Grand Prix